The second inauguration of William McKinley as president of the United States was held on Monday, March 4, 1901, at the East Portico of the United States Capitol in Washington, D.C. This was the 29th inauguration and marked the commencement of the second and final term of William McKinley as president and the only term of Theodore Roosevelt as vice president. McKinley died  days into this term, and Roosevelt succeeded to the presidency.

Chief Justice Melville Fuller administered the oath of office. This was the first inauguration to take place in the 20th century. This was also the first inauguration to be arranged by the Joint Committee on Inaugural Ceremonies and organized by both the House of Representatives and the Senate.

Gallery

See also
Presidency of William McKinley
First inauguration of William McKinley
1900 United States presidential election
President McKinley Inauguration Footage

References

External links

 Text of McKinley's Second Inaugural Address

United States presidential inaugurations
1901 in Washington, D.C.
1901 in American politics
Inauguration
March 1901 events
Articles containing video clips